Bradley Hartman (born 16 November 1994) is a former professional Australian rules footballer who played for the Geelong Football Club in the Australian Football League (AFL). He was drafted by Geelong with the 77th selection in the 2012 AFL Draft. He made his debut in round 13, 2014. After 5 games in 2014, Hartman took leave from the club at the start of the 2015 pre-season for personal reasons. After a period off Hartman decided to retire from AFL football due to personal issues.

Statistics

|- style="background-color: #EAEAEA"
! scope="row" style="text-align:center" | 2013
|
| 36 || 0 || — || — || — || — || — || — || — || — || — || — || — || — || — || —
|-
! scope="row" style="text-align:center" | 2014
|
| 36 || 5 || 1 || 0 || 21 || 17 || 38 || 2 || 13 || 0.2 || 0.0 || 4.2 || 3.4 || 7.6 || 0.4 || 2.6
|- style="background-color: #EAEAEA"
! scope="row" style="text-align:center" | 2015
|
| 36 || 0 || — || — || — || — || — || — || — || — || — || — || — || — || — || —
|- class="sortbottom"
! colspan=3| Career
! 5
! 1
! 0
! 21
! 17
! 38
! 2
! 13
! 0.2
! 0.0
! 4.2
! 3.4
! 7.6
! 0.4
! 2.6
|}

References

External links

1994 births
Living people
Geelong Football Club players
Australian rules footballers from South Australia
Sturt Football Club players
Indigenous Australian players of Australian rules football